The Arkansas Valley Regional Medical Center is a regional hospital in La Junta, Colorado. The present hospital building was completed in 1971, replacing earlier hospital buildings and sanitariums that had existed since the early 20th century.
 
The medical center currently has 92 licensed beds. It also operates a nursing home, called the Nursing Care Center, located on the medical center campus.
 
The hospital is a Level IV trauma center.

References

External links
Hospital website
 

Hospitals in Colorado
Buildings and structures in Otero County, Colorado
Hospital buildings completed in 1971